This is a list of prisons and detention centres within Guangdong province of the People's Republic of China.

Prisons

Detention centres

See also
 Penal system in China

References 
 

Guandong